The term Eden Centre may refer to:

Eden, High Wycombe, a shopping centre in High Wycombe, Buckinghamshire
The Eden Project, a biological visitor centre in Cornwall